Glyphodes formosanus is a moth in the family Crambidae. It was described by Shibuya in 1928. It is found in Taiwan.

References

Moths described in 1928
Glyphodes